The Cobra Troopers serve as the basic foot soldiers of the Cobra Organization, as part of the G.I. Joe: A Real American Hero toyline, comic books and animated series. They are generally depicted as legions of uniformed soldiers, nearly all of them masked to appear anonymous, and widely diversified according to specialties and functions.

History
The Cobra Soldiers were introduced in 1982, with the code name "The Enemy". These are the basic infantry soldiers equipped with conventional military gear (as opposed to the more hi-tech accouterments of the later Vipers). They were prominently featured on both the cartoon and comic series, and depicted as unintelligent and slightly cowardly.

Cobra infantry troopers are issued a combination assault rifle and grenade launcher, with advanced night vision, telescopic sight, and range finder. Multi-layered body armor and composite helmets with built-in communications gear are standard issue. Vipers are superbly trained, formidably equipped, and highly motivated.

Other Cobra troopers
Later, Cobra troopers consisted of communications troops, computer specialists, security, and soldiers. Some of the more prominent include:

Vipers
Viper is the code-name given to a large majority of the Cobra Troopers. With the exception of the Viper infantry trooper, the code name "Viper" is usually preceded by their area of expertise.

Introduced in 1986 as a replacement for the Cobra Soldiers, the Cobra Viper infantry soldiers complement the Cobra Soldiers in both the cartoon and comic series. The concept, originally introduced in 1985 with the introduction of "Tele-Vipers" (communication experts), quickly evolved into a catch-all suffix for all future Cobra troops (such as Air-Viper, Ice-Vipers, Desert-Vipers, Techno-Vipers, etc.). Hasbro has often alternated between establishing the Vipers as the entry-level position into Cobra's legion, or for them to be the elite of Cobra's ground troops, as far as them being equal to or above the regular soldier troops.

Vipers can opt for additional training that enables them to transfer to specialized units, focusing on specific military specialties. These units are considered elite and are constantly examined for effectiveness. Some are renamed and reorganized, absorbed into other units, or sometimes completely phased out. Some units customize their chain of command, allowing for unique Viper designations with distinct leaders.

Eels
The Cobra Eels are the underwater demolition specialists of the Cobra legions. They undergo a rigorous two-part training program, first in the shark and pirate infested waters of the Caribbean, and then in the frigid depths of the North Atlantic. Their training regimen includes marine engineering, explosive ordnance, underwater fighting techniques, and marine geology. Eels are responsible for manning and operating Cobra marine outposts disguised as off-shore drilling rigs, and for augmenting the crews of large Cobra naval vessels.

Lampreys
The Cobra Lampreys are Cobra's amphibious assault troopers, responsible for operation of Cobra naval vehicles, patrol around naval bases and attack. They are culled from the Eel units, and are considered elite among Cobra naval troopers, with only the Cobra Morays considered higher. To qualify for Lamprey training, candidates must be a Cobra Trooper in top physical condition, have completed his Eel training, and have been operational as an Eel for more than a year. The training is highly selective, and more than 50% of the applicants quit before completing the course.

Morays
The Morays are the next step in marine warfare, evolving from the most elite of the Eel division. They must undergo the same rigorous training program, which involves underwater fighting techniques, the study of marine geology, and the use of explosive ordnance. However, the Morays also utilize the same bio-tech engineering that is used by the Neo-Vipers, which gives them increased strength, underwater vision, and bodies that can better withstand the pressures of deep sea diving.

Snow Serpents
Snow Serpents are the Arctic Specialist branch of Cobra. They must undergo the same rigorous training program as the Eels, with the addition of a six-month cold weather course, somewhere above the Arctic Circle. Other aspects of their training include airborne operations under arctic conditions, anti-tank procedures, and the use of snow-shoes, skis and kayaks.

Crimson Guard

The Crimson Guard are the most elite soldiers of Cobra's Viper legions, under the direct command of Tomax and Xamot, but completely loyal to Cobra Commander, serving as his personal guard.

Python Patrol

Python Patrol is a codename given to a subgroup of Vipers and other Cobra troops whose uniforms have undergone the "pythonization" process. This renders their uniforms immune to radar and other forms of electronic detection. The unit has been led by both Copperhead and Major Bludd. In one instance, Zarana leads a unit on an attack on G.I. Joe's headquarters the Pit.

List of Cobra troopers
 Air Devil - Acrobatic Aerial Assault Trooper
 B.A.T.s - Cobra's androids. Their name is short for Battle Android Troopers.
 Cobra Blackstar - Cobra Elite Space Pilot
 Cobra C.L.A.W.S. - Combat Light Armored Weapons Specialist; Heavy Weapons Trooper
 Cobra Coils - High Speed Pursuit Vehicle Drivers; Cobra Tread Fire Driver
 Cobra Eels - Cobra Frogman
 Cobra H.I.S.S. Driver - Cobra H.I.S.S. Driver
 Cobra Moray - Underwater Elite Trooper
 Cobra Officer - Cobra Squad Leader
 Cobra Stinger Driver - Cobra Stinger Driver
 Cobra Soldier - Cobra Basic Infantry
 Desert Scorpion - Cobra Desert Trooper
 Incinerators - Cobra Flamethrowers
 Lampreys - Cobra Moray Hydrofoil Pilot
 Night Creepers - Cobra Mercenary Ninjas
 Night Vulture - Cobra Air Recon Trooper
 Sea Slugs - Cobra Sea Ray Pilot
 Snow Serpent - Cobra Polar Assault
 W.O.R.M.S. - Weapons Ordnance Rugged Machine Specialists; Cobra Maggot Driver

List of Viper variations

The Hydro-Vipers are actually part of the Cobra Eels, and the Ice-Vipers are part of the Snow Serpents. How it is that these troops are "Vipers" and yet part of a non-Viper unit has never been explained by Hasbro.

Toys 
The first figure to receive the designation "Viper" was the Viper Pilot (included with the Cobra Viper Attack Glider) in 1983. In 1985, Hasbro released the Tele-Viper (Cobra Communications) alongside other Cobra troops without the Viper designation, such as the Snow Serpent (Cobra Polar Assault) and the Eel (Cobra Frogman).

For the most part since then, Cobra troops, including drivers and pilots, have had the Viper code name attached to their area of expertise. The Cobra Soldier figure was the standard infantry trooper for Cobra, until 1986 when Hasbro released the Cobra Viper figure. The Viper's uniform featured a black flak jacket and a mirrored mask that resembled the battle mask worn by Cobra Commander. This figure was later released both as part of the Python Patrol and Sonic Fighters sub-lines of G.I. Joe in alternate colors, in 1989 and 1990 respectively.

In 1994 a new standard infantry Viper figure was released with a new look (purple armor with gas mask). In the G.I. Joe comic book series published by Marvel Comics, this version of the Viper was portrayed in a yellow-gold color. This new uniform did not last long and the more familiar Viper look later returned.

Comics

Marvel Comics 
Alley Vipers made their first appearance in issue #92 of the G.I. Joe series. They fight the G.I. Joe Team in the fictional city of Rio Lindo.

Several Cobra Vipers fight the Joe team in issue #113, in the fictional country of Benzheen, including Alley Vipers, Frag-Vipers and one Range-Viper. An Alley-Viper and Frag Viper send out a child into fire, this draws Sneak Peek, whom the Range-Viper kills. Other Joes raid the Cobra position, and the Alley-Viper is killed by Stalker.

Alley Vipers also fight Mutt and Spirit in Millville, a town Cobra was attempting to conquer, and appear in issue #145, where they fight G.I. Joe in Borovia.

Devil's Due 
Vipers are seen working closely with Dreadnoks in Cobra's first push to revive in seven years. They then work closely with Iron Grenadiers. In a push to claim power in America, Cobra forces have used microscopic nanites to attack everything from communication systems to random citizens. Vipers and Cobra allies are presented as "saviors", but they are simply outright killers, for example they murder every member of a US National Guard relief convoy and distribute the supplies themselves. Vipers are part of the forces that march on the White House, which is defended by a multi-military effort, including several Joe soldiers. The Vipers kill multiple Joe rookies (collectively called "Greenshirts").

Several Alley-Vipers are slain while assisting the Dreadnoks in battling an out of control Battle Android Trooper. A single Alley-Viper is a part of the team combing Cobra Island for the infiltrator Barrel Roll. Several Alley-Vipers are part of the Cobra forces infiltrating the town of New Moon, Colorado, and are also used in a Cobra demonstration at Safeco Field in Seattle, Washington.

A Range-Viper code-named Skull Buster had made his home in the wilds of Namibia. When Shipwreck and Cover-Girl wash up on shore, he decides to kill them by faking their deaths from exposure; simple murder would cause too much of an investigation and disrupt his 'retirement' in the bush. Shipwreck stuns the man with scorpion venom and he is taken back to civilization, a fate he fears.

A particular Range-Viper code-named Body Bags is featured in a long running storyline in the America's Elite comics. He is one of many drawn from the ranks of Cobra soldiers to join The Plague, Cobra's latest answer to the elite of the G.I. Joe team.

Two Vipers becomes swept up in the events of the alternate universe series, G.I. Joe Vs. Transformers 2. As with other prominent Joe and Cobra characters, they agree to help rescue time-stranded Transformers. Failure means non-existence for all humans. One viper, Percy, goes with the Baroness, Beach-Head and Roadblock and Prohibition time and tries to assist there; though he is mostly derided for his efforts. Another assists three Joes in dinosaur times, turning a team of Autobots into the Dinobots.

Cartoons

Sunbow 
The Cobra Troopers were the foot soldiers of Cobra in the Sunbow G.I. Joe: A Real American Hero cartoon. They were voiced by several voice actors including: Michael Bell, Arthur Burghardt, Peter Cullen, Pat Fraley, Buster Jones, Chris Latta, Bill Ratner, and Frank Welker.

The Cobra Vipers made their first animated appearance in "Arise Serpentor Arise!", which began the second season of the Sunbow produced series. They were used as common infantry for the remainder of the season, primarily replacing the blue and black masked Cobra soldiers of the first season (although those soldiers would still appear from time to time).

One Viper was voiced by Michael Bell. The Strato-Vipers that spoke were voiced by Jack Angel and Bill Ratner. The Tele-Vipers that spoke were voiced by Michael Bell, Chris Latta, and Frank Welker.

DiC 

The Cobra Troopers were also the foot soldiers in the DiC G.I. Joe: A Real American Hero cartoon. Some of the Cobra Troopers loyal to Cobra Commander became soldiers in Cobra Commander's Python Patrol.

Following G.I. Joe: The Movie, in the DiC run of cartoons, the main silver face-plated Cobra Vipers were replaced by various branches of Vipers (such as Range-Vipers and Laser-Vipers).

The Alley Vipers played heavy into the plot of the first mini series from the DiC produced G.I. Joe cartoon. G.I. Joe member Scoop is in training as a Crimson Guardsman, and his closest friend in Cobra is an Alley Viper. Scoop helps Cobra Commander take control back from Serpentor.

The Range-Vipers appeared in many episodes of the cartoon. Two Range-Vipers appeared to have a vendetta against two G.I. Joe members: Captain Grid-Iron and Ambush.

 The First Range-Viper appeared in "Pigskin Commandos", he played quarterback for the pro football team, but hated Grid-Iron who was the quarterback of the other team.
 The Second Ranger-Viper was a female named Ivy, who used to be the friend of Ambush. She was able to find all his hiding places until Ambush disappeared to join G.I. Joe and she vowed to kill him because he left without saying goodbye.

Techno-Vipers and Hydro-Vipers were only featured (cartoon-wise) in the commercials, since the 80s Sunbow cartoon had finished its production by the time their figures were released.

G.I. Joe: Sigma 6
The Cobra Soldiers appear in G.I. Joe: Sigma 6.

G.I. Joe: Resolute 
Cobra Soldiers appear in G.I. Joe: Resolute. Alley Vipers were updated for the Resolute cartoon, and were in an all blue uniform.

G.I. Joe: Renegades 
The Cobra Troopers in G.I. Joe: Renegades were depicted as the security guards for the facilities of Cobra Industries, such as Cobra Pharmaceuticals. They were voiced by were voiced by Charlie Adler, Carlos Alazraqui, Michael Bell, Matthew Yang King, Andrew Kishino, Jason Marsden, Khary Payton, and Kevin Michael Richardson.

In G.I. Joe: Renegades, there are also different Vipers who are not human:
 The Bio Vipers are artificial creatures created by Doctor Mindbender from a blue liquid developed from experimentally altered plants. Originally, the Bio-Vipers lacked a nervous system and showed weaknesses to explosions and weed killer. However, Mindbender upgrades his creations with bio-dampening chips, which makes them smarter, but leaves them vulnerable to head shots. These creatures share many traits and attributes with the "synthoids" of the original cartoon, and seem to be an homage to them.
 A freak accident caused by Ripcord absorbing Bio-Viper matter into his body, created the potential to produce a human-Bio-Viper hybrid, with Cobra Commander seeing the potential of achieving immortality through it, upon being experimented on by Doctor Mindbender. To ensure control, Doctor Mindbender places a control chip on Ripcord, in order to turn him into a Bio-Viper on command. After the events of "Prodigal", Doctor Mindbender attempts to duplicate the DNA combination in "The Anomaly".
 During the events of "The Enemy of My Enemy", Doctor Mindbender is forced to work alongside Destro to combine their research to produce a combination of the Bio-Viper and M.A.R.S exo suits. Though earlier attempts failed, Doctor Mindbender devised a perfect fusion in the creation of the Mecha-Vipers.
 In "White Out," Shadow Vipers are black-colored versions of Bio Vipers, which were created to respond to Storm Shadow's mental commands, after Tomax and Xamot are used to establish a psychic link. The Shadow Vipers can materialize any part of them into ninja weapons, from katana-bladed arms to shurikens.
 A Techno-Viper is a specially created prototype Bio-Viper that was synthesized with nanotechnology, enabling it to absorb energy and manipulate any machine that it comes in contact with. But as the prototype Techno-Viper was uncontrollable, Cobra Industries had to put it into a container and keep it in cold temperatures.
 During the events of "Shipwrecked", G.I. Joe found a container holding a prototype Techno-Viper in Canada, and later disposed of it. During the fight, Scarlett managed to set the Techno-Viper's destination to be Castle McCullen in Scotland. When learning of this, as he and Baroness interrogated the Joes, Destro suspects that Doctor Mindbender probably programmed the Techno-Viper to dispose of him.
 Though Mindbender's first attempt was seemingly a failure, the artificial human/Bio-Viper hybrid code named 14-C, managed to reform itself in the sewers in New York City. Its lurking in the sewers caused it to be referred to as a Sewer Viper. However, lacking the ability to assume human form, the Sewer Viper spirited a kid named Reggie into the sewers, while hurting a teenager named Ray for bullying him. News of this attracted Cobra Commander's attention, as he orders Doctor Mindbender to reclaim the Sewer Viper before it is caught by the authorities. At the same time, Duke, Roadblock, Tunnel Rat and Ripcord descend into the sewers to find Reggie and the Sewer Viper, revealed to be a good guy. Coming to the Joes' aid when captured by Mindbender, the Sewer Viper is revealed to lack a control chip while managing to remove the control chip from Ripcord. The Sewer Viper sacrifices itself, absorbing the explosion from the fail-safe that Mindbender installed, should his mental link with the Bio-Vipers' control chips be broken.

Film

G.I. Joe: The Rise of Cobra 
Neo-Vipers were Cobra troopers who were enhanced with nanomites by The Doctor. These enhancements removed their self-preservation instincts and their sense of pain, and made them completely obedient to Cobra.

Cobra Vipers originally consisted mostly of mercenaries and criminals, however after the completion of all of Cobra's nano experimentation Neo-Vipers may have mostly consisted of kidnapped soldiers from around the world. Twenty mercenaries were selected for the painful series of injections, and the ones who did not die became super soldiers.

Each subject was injected with 1,000 CCs of nanomite solution, which left a small scar in the shape of a small cobra's head (all nano injected members of Cobra bear this mark, including Baroness, Zartan and much later Destro). After injection, specially designed nanomites both attack and rewire the subject's central nervous system, making the subject completely under the absolute control of their controller (the only exception to this was Zartan, who destroyed the neural controlling nanomites before he was injected).

Video games 
Some Vipers (such as Hydro-Vipers and Toxo-Vipers) appeared as regular enemies in the 1991 G.I. Joe video game for the Nintendo Entertainment System. Unusually for a non-individual, a Range-Viper appeared as a boss in the game.

Vipers also appeared in the game G.I. Joe: The Atlantis Factor.

Konami released an arcade-only G.I.Joe video game in 1992. Vipers were prominent enemies.

Other works 
 Cobra Vipers are an important plot element in the G.I. Joe novel Divide and Conquer.
 A Viper figure is briefly featured in the fiction novel 6 Sick Hipsters. In the story, the character Paul Achting spent four years collecting G.I. Joe figures to set up a battle scene between the Joes and Cobra. As he imagined the characters in his head, he observed the "core of Cobra Command" atop an oak toy chest, high above the thick shag carpet, while a nearby Viper, "one of many similarly dressed infantrymen, stood at the ready alongside a ragged copy of The Haunted Spy".
 Range-Viper is mentioned as one of many Cobra toys in a New Yorker article, page 142, printed on December 10, 1993.

See also 
 Cobra Command
 List of Cobra characters
 List of G.I. Joe: A Real American Hero characters

References

External links 
 Cobra Vipers at JMM's G.I. Joe Comics Home Page

Villains in animated television series
Cobra (G.I. Joe) soldiers
Fictional aviators
Fictional drivers
Fictional engineers
Fictional physicians
Fictional private military members
Fictional special forces personnel